

Land Lines 
To dial a land line in Cambodia all over the country, the format is Area Code + Phone Number. The area code is 3 digits long, followed by a 6 or 7 digit phone number.

Calls made from outside Cambodia must omit the prefix 0. Therefore, to call a land line number in Phnom Penh from other countries, dialing begins with +855 23 followed by 6 or 7 digits.

Area code 

Area codes starting with 02
Phnom Penh - 023
Kandal - 024
Kampong Speu - 025
Kampong Chhnang - 026

Area codes starting with 03
Takeo - 032
Kampot - 033
Sihanoukville - 034
Koh Kong - 035
Kep - 036

Area codes starting with 04
Kampong Cham - 042
Prey Veng - 043
Svay Rieng - 044

Area codes starting with 05
Pursat - 052
Battambang - 053
Banteay Meanchey - 054
Pailin - 055

Area codes starting with 06
Kampong Thom - 062
Siem Reap - 063
Preah Vihear - 064
Oddar Meanchey - 065

Area codes starting with 07
Kratie - 072
Mondulkiri - 073
Stung Treng - 074
Ratanakiri - 075

Likewise to call mobile phones from land line or other mobile phones, domestic dialing begins a 0 followed by 8 or 9 digits.

Mobile numbers in Cambodia take the form: 0TT-AXX-XXXY.

The first two numbers after the leading 0 or 'TT' in the example above identify the operator. For example, 010 234 567 is an example of a 9 digit mobile number from Smart. 088 234 5678 on the other hand is an example of a 10 digit mobile number from Metfone.

The 3rd digit after the leading 0 or 'A' in the example above must be between 1 and 9. Normally this value is between 2 and 9 which allows a value of '1' to be used for mobile phones which are roaming in Cambodia. However some operators such as Mobitel are using a '1' in this range to extend their number ranges for certain popular prefixes. For example, 012 123 4567 and 092 123 456 are valid mobile numbers in Ca

'X' can take the values 0 to 9 and 'Y' is an optional extra digit which is used by some operators.

Most mobile numbers are 8 digits long (excluding the leading 0), however some operators are now using 9 digit numbers. 0882345678 is an example of a valid 9 digit mobile number.+85592662075

Calls made from outside Cambodia must omit the prefix 0. Therefore, to call a mobile number in Cambodia from other countries, dialing begins with +855 1, +855 8, or +855 92662075/9 etc.

Network Operators

See also 
 Telecommunications in Cambodia

References 

Cambodia
Telecommunications in Cambodia
Cambodia communications-related lists